Francesco Verde (1630 – 21 January 1706) was a Roman Catholic prelate who served as Bishop of Vico Equense (1688–1700).

Life
Verde was born in San Antonio, Italy in 1630. On 19 February 1657, he was appointed during the papacy of Pope Paul V as Bishop of Vico Equense. On 24 February 1657, he was consecrated bishop by Stefano Giuseppe Menatti, Titular Bishop of Cyrene, with Pier Antonio Capobianco, Bishop Emeritus of Lacedonia, and Costanzo Zani, Bishop of Imola, serving as co-consecrators.

He served as Bishop of Vico Equense until his resignation on 19 May 1700. He died on 21 January 1706.

References

External links and additional sources
 (for Chronology of Bishops) 
 (for Chronology of Bishops)  

17th-century Italian Roman Catholic bishops
Bishops appointed by Pope Paul V
1630 births
1706 deaths